Bishop Allen and the Broken String is the second full-length album by the indie rock group Bishop Allen. It was released on July 24, 2007.

Ten of the twelve tracks are re-workings of selections from the 12 EP project the band did in 2006.

Track listing
 "The Monitor" – 3:42
 "Rain" – 3:36
 "Click, Click, Click, Click" – 3:08
 "The Chinatown Bus" – 3:22
 "Flight 180" – 5:10
 "Like Castanets" – 3:17
 "Butterfly Nets" – 3:12
 "Shrinking Violet" – 1:51
 "Corazon" – 4:21
 "Middle Management" – 2:43
 "Choose Again" – 3:12
 "The News from Your Bed" – 2:45

Many uncommon instrumental arrangements are found in The Broken String, such as "Butterfly Nets" (ukulele, saxophone) or "Shrinking Violets" (banjo, oboe).

References

2007 albums
Bishop Allen albums
Dead Oceans albums